Nilda Maria (born Nilda Maria Gonçalves de Pina Fernandes) is a Cape Verdean politician and member of parliament for the South Santiago electoral area, and president of the Cape Verdean Solidarity Foundation.

Biography
Nilda Maria has been active in her capacity as member of parliament to tackling the housing deficit situation of Cape Verde and has supported the prime minister's project dubbed "Operation Hope" intended to provide homes for all citizens. As at 2009, she has served as president of the Cape Verdean Solidarity Foundation, an organisation that promotes better living conditions for the most needy families, especially women who play the role of heads of their households, people with disabilities and the elderly in society. By its fourth anniversary, the Operation Hope project has had more than 18 thousand beneficiaries including renovation and constructed of new homes from scratch not only in Cape Verde, but also for Cape Verdeans in the diaspora in Mozambique and São Tomé and Príncipe.

References

Living people
Members of the National Assembly (Cape Verde)
Cape Verdean women in politics
Year of birth missing (living people)